Baleares (F71) is the lead ship of five Spanish-built s, based on the American  design, of the Spanish Navy.

Laid down in October 1968 and launched on 20 August 1970, Baleares was commissioned into service on 24 September 1973.

All of these Spanish frigates were built to the size of the Knox frigates.

Other units of class 
 
 
 
 

Ships of the Spanish Navy
1973 ships
Baleares-class frigates
Frigates of the Cold War